Events from the year 1919 in Denmark.

Incumbents
 Monarch - Christian X
 Prime minister - Carl Theodor Zahle

Events
 1 October – Retsplejeloven enters into force, implementing a major reform of the Danish judicial system originally adopted on 11 April 1916.
 1 November – Vigerslev train crash takes place in the Valby district of Copenhagen.

The arts

Music
 15 November – Premiere of Hakon Børresen's opera Den Kongelige Gæst at the Royal Danish Theatre.

Sports
 15 May  Brønshøj Boldklub is founded.

Date unknown
 AB wins its first Danish football championship by defeating Boldklubben 1901 30 in the final of the 1918–19 Danish National Football Tournament.

Births
 24 August – Niels Viggo Bentzon, composer (died 2000)
 7 December – Lis Løwert, actress (died 2009)
 21 December – Ove Sprogøe, actor (died 2004)

Deaths

 6 January – Eline Hansen, feminist (born 1859)

References

 
Denmark
Years of the 20th century in Denmark
1910s in Denmark